Daniel Scott Miller (born December 30, 1960) is a former American football kicker in the National Football League for the Washington Redskins, Baltimore Colts, and the New England Patriots and in the United States Football League for the Birmingham Stallions.  He played college football at the University of Miami and was drafted in the eleventh round of the 1982 NFL Draft.

His nephew Andrew Miller is a relief pitcher for the St. Louis Cardinals.

1960 births
Living people
Sportspeople from West Palm Beach, Florida
American football placekickers
Miami Hurricanes football players
Washington Redskins players
Baltimore Colts players
New England Patriots players
Players of American football from Florida